Last Stop is a supernatural adventure video game developed by Variable State and published by Annapurna Interactive for Microsoft Windows, Nintendo Switch, PlayStation 4, PlayStation 5, Xbox One, and Xbox Series X/S.

Gameplay 
Last Stop is a third-person game, where players control one of three main characters, by deciding what they should say and performing a variety of minigame interactions.

Plot 
In 1980s London, teenage friends Peter Hale and Samantha steal a bobby's helmet from an officer and escape into the tunnels of the London Underground. Taking a service tunnel, they are surprised to find an oddly well-dressed man mysteriously awaiting their arrival. After introducing himself as Frank, he opens a nearby door onto a green portal, offering the two teenagers the opportunity to "step inside"; further warning that "time is running out". Samantha accepts while Peter hesitates. A disappointed Frank says his goodbyes and enters the portal, the door shutting behind him. The pursuing bobbies arrive seconds later, opening the door to find nothing but a wall; the portal, along with Samantha and Frank, gone without a trace.

The game then jumps to 2020s London, covering three stories:
 "Paper Dolls" John Smith, a middle-aged father to daughter, Molly Smith, and Jack Smith (no relation), a young programmer that lives in a nearby building but otherwise unrelated, find their bodies switched after a run-in with the same older man in the Underground. After coming to grips with the situation and telling Molly what has happened, they try to live out each other's lives, but both end up getting fired from their jobs. John, in Jack's body, is able to reapply for his old job with the help of friend of the family and fellow co-worker Shazia Aslam. Meanwhile Jack, in John's body, is hospitalized after suffering a heart attack. John is contacted by the Vape Lord, a vaping store owner who is brothers with Frank, the older man that inadvertently swapped their bodies. The Vape Lord apologizes and offers John travel through a green portal to meet Frank and get the means to return to his own body.
 "Domestic Affairs" Meena Hughes is a high-level agent with an intelligence firm run by an elderly Peter Hale. She is screened for an important mission, but Peter also brings in Amy Ng, a relatively new employee, as a second possible candidate. This puts Meena at unease, as she is having an affair with Felix Ajibola, while trying to maintain her marriage to Dan Hughes and their son Dylan Hughes. She also is appalled that her father, Samir Patel, has been buying drugs off a street vendor working under the alias 'Spider'; later revealed to be Gavin Briggs. One night on returning home she finds a note that reveals the writer knows of her affair. Her personal investigation into who may have written the note leads to further strain on her marriage. Suspecting Spider had written the note, she follows him to a garage and confronts him, only for Amy to show up shortly afterward and threaten Spider. Meena tries to defuse the situation but Spider and Amy shoot each other; Spider is killed and while Meena first tries to save Amy's life, realizes she was likely the one spying on her. Leaving Amy to die, Meena enters Amy's flat and finds several top secret files on her that show she had been stalking her. She goes to Peter to call him out, only to learn that the mission, to enter a green portal that has just opened and look for Samantha, is now on. Meena tries to make one last call to Dan to save her marriage before donning a special suit and is lowered through the portal.
 "Stranger Danger" Donna Adeleke is a teenage student living with her mum, Tamara Adeleke, her sister, Emma Adeleke, and Emma's fiancée, Aisling Fisher. While hanging with her schoolmates Vivek Chowdhry and Becky Kim, they spot a handsome man whom Vivek claims to see take people into his house but has never seen them leave. They follow him to an abandoned swimming pool and spy on him as he enters the water glowing green. He discovers their presence, but Becky knocks him out and they secure him there. The three maintain a watch, fearing the man will go to the police. The man doesn't speak except when alone with Donna, and gets Donna to talk about her problems with her family. Out of Donna's sight, the man uses his powers to cause Aisling to be completely wiped from history and memories. Over time, the man similarly wipes Tamara, Emma, Vivek, and Becky from Donna's memory, leaving her living alone in the pool. The man tells her that he can take her elsewhere, and leads him back to his house where a hole over a green portal sits. As they descend through, Donna sees the bodies of those he made disappear and while she cannot remember them directly, suspects she knows them.

The three stories converge in the final chapter. Meena lands hard on an alien planet but is saved by Irving, an alien that guides her to a large settlement. Donna is escorted by the stranger on a train to the same settlement, and when another alien pesters the man about Donna, he uses his powers to cause the alien to disappear, which Donna sees and realizes that he has done that to her friends and family. John arrives and finds Frank who apologizes about the swap and gives him a bracelet to undo it. All three converge onto the council chambers, however, Donna becomes scared about being with the stranger and impales him with a sword. The three are taken prisoner and held on trial, where they are sentenced to death. Meena uses an explosive on her suit to distract the guards so the three escape the judgement arena and they end up crashing into a pub where they find an elderly Samantha. Samantha helps to hide them and explains that she doesn't want to go back since she has made a life here. Samantha explains how they can return to Earth, and after distracting the guards protecting the portal, the three return safely.

The player then has an option to resolve each story with two choices. For John, either John can decide to swap bodies, or otherwise continue to live out his life in Jack's younger body. For Donna, a ghost of the stranger appears and offers her a contract by which he will return all those he took from her in exchange for Donna having to join him forever after she dies, or otherwise continue to be alone. For Meena, she lies to Peter about Samantha's fate, and Peter feels all his work to now has been for naught. As to punish Meena, he shows her images from the shootout between Spider and Amy, revealing he had been manipulating her all along. Meena can either quietly accept a lower position in the company but otherwise protect herself and her family from any repercussions, or she can quit and take the fall for the murders.

Development 
Last Stop is the second game developed by Variable State, a British independent game developer founded by Jonathan Burroughs and Terry Kenny, former developers with DeepMind Technologies. The game's composer is Lyndon Holland, winner of the 2016 British Academy Games Award for music.

The game was first announced at Microsoft's Xbox London event in November 2019. Additional information about the game was shared during the Xbox Games Showcase in July 2020. The game was released in July 2021.

Reception 
Last Stop received "mixed or average" reviews, according to review aggregator Metacritic.

References

External links
 

2021 video games
Adventure games
Annapurna Interactive games
Art games
Exploration video games
Supernatural fiction
Video games about psychic powers
Video games about the paranormal
Indie video games
Nintendo Switch games
PlayStation 4 games
PlayStation 5 games
Psychological horror games
Single-player video games
Video games developed in the United Kingdom
Windows games
Xbox One games
Xbox Series X and Series S games
Video games set in London
Video games set in the 2020s
Video games featuring black protagonists